Robert Eagar is an Irish lawyer who was a judge of the High Court between October 2014 and January 2023. He was formerly a solicitor with an expertise in criminal law.

Early life 
Eagar was educated at University College Dublin from where he graduated with a BCL degree in 1977. He attended the Law Society of Ireland and was added to the Roll of Solicitors in 1978.

Legal career 
He began his career as a solicitor at the Office of the Chief State Solicitor, a constituent part of the Office of the Attorney General, working there until 1984. In 1982, he was involved in proceedings in the Circuit Court involving a licensing request by the owner of the Stardust nightclub. He was the prosecuting solicitor in a case against Vinnie Doyle and the Irish Independent for a breach of the Official Secrets Act.

He joined the law firm of Garrett Sheehan in 1984, becoming a partner in 1995. His expertise as a solicitor was in criminal law, extradition, asylum law, human rights law and child law. He has represented an anti-war activist convicted of damage to US military property, fugitive solicitor Michael Lynn, the former company secretary of Anglo Irish Bank on trial for tax offences, and a Christian Brother accused of 110 charges of indecent assault. He has also acted as a solicitor for clients accused of murder and fraud. He has acted in cases involving judicial review in the Supreme Court of Ireland and cases in the Court of Criminal Appeal.

In 2008, he called for the Minister for Justice Brian Lenihan Jnr to fund an independent forensic laboratory.

He was a member of the Law Society's Criminal Law Committee and a lecturer in criminal law. He is a former chair of the Dublin Simon Community, a founder of the Irish Refugee Council and board member of the Ranelagh Multi-Denominational School.

Judicial career 
Eagar was appointed a Judge of the High Court in October 2014. He has been the presiding judge in cases involving criminal law, defamation law, equality law, medical negligence, judicial review, and refugee law.

He has presided over cases in the Special Criminal Court. He was the judge in bail hearings involving Lisa Smith and those accused of the murder of Ana Kriégel and the kidnapping of Kevin Lunney.

He was a designated judge to report to the Taoiseach on the operation of the Criminal Justice (Surveillance) Act 2009.

He retired as judge in January 2023.

Personal life 
Eagar is married to Monica and has two daughters.

References 

Living people
Alumni of University College Dublin
High Court judges (Ireland)
21st-century Irish judges
Irish solicitors
Year of birth missing (living people)